Kalhu Dasht-e Bala (also Romanized as Kalhū Dasht-e Bālā) is a village in Feyziyeh Rural District, in the Central District of Babol County, Mazandaran Province, Iran. At the 2006 census, its population was 146, in 39 families.

References 

Populated places in Babol County